The year 1935 in archaeology involved some significant events.

Excavations
 September 18: Excavation of the Kirkhaugh cairns in Northumberland (England) by Herbert Maryon begins.
 December: Chinese prehistorian Jia Lanpo appointed field director of the continuing excavations at Peking Man site in Zhoukoudian, China.

Finds
 February 28: The Ladby ship Viking grave is discovered on Funen in Denmark.
 June 29: First portion of Swanscombe skull, belonging to a woman from 400,000 BP, is discovered in England.
 October 7: The skeleton of the Mesolithic Loschbour man is discovered in Mullerthal, Luxembourg.
 A hoard of more than 11,000 Celtic coins is discovered at La Marquanderie on the Channel Island of Jersey.
 The mural of the Investiture of Zimrilim is discovered in Mari, Syria.
 Viking Age ruins at Narsaq in Greenland are discovered by Aage Roussell.

Events
 July: The Ahnenerbe is established in Nazi Germany as a division of the Schutzstaffel "for the Study of the History of Primeval Ideas" in support of Nazi racial ideology.
 August 2: The  is raised from Lake Champlain.
 V. Gordon Childe delivers the inaugural Presidential address to The Prehistoric Society in England on 'Changing Methods and Aims in Prehistory'.
 Col. William Hawley reburies cremated human remains in A47 of the Aubrey holes at Stonehenge in England.

Awards
 Leonard Woolley knighted for his work in archaeology.

Births
 January 19: Robin Birley, English archaeologist, director of excavations at the Roman site of Vindolanda (d. 2018)

Deaths
 May 11: Edward Herbert Thompson, American Mayanist (b. 1857)
 May 19: T. E. Lawrence, British archaeologist of the Middle East, military officer, diplomat and author, result of motorcycle accident (b. 1888)
 December 2: James Henry Breasted, American Egyptologist (b. 1865)

References 

Archaeology
Archaeology
Archaeology by year